is a Japanese football player.

Club statistics
Updated to 23 February 2016.

References

External links

1981 births
Living people
Fukuoka University alumni
Association football people from Kumamoto Prefecture
Japanese footballers
J1 League players
J2 League players
Kashima Antlers players
Hokkaido Consadole Sapporo players
Association football goalkeepers
Universiade medalists in football
Universiade gold medalists for Japan